Sex is the biological distinction of an organism between male and female.

Sex or SEX may also refer to:

Biology and behaviour
Animal sexual behaviour
Copulation (zoology)
Human sexual activity
Non-penetrative sex, or sexual outercourse
Sex drive, a person's overall sexual drive or desire for sexual activity
Sexual intercourse, also called copulation or coitus
Gender, the distinction between male and female or masculinity and femininity within an individual's gender identity
Sex–gender distinction
Human sexuality
Mating types, a distinction of gametes, whether in anisogamous or isogamous species
Sexing, the act of discerning the sex of an animal
Sexual reproduction, a process of combining and mixing genetic traits, associated with the generation of new individuals, by means of meiosis and fertilization
Genetic recombination, the process of mixing genetic traits solely, occurring both in organisms with sexual or asexual reproduction

Art and entertainment

Film and television
Sex (film), a 1920 film by Fred Niblo
Sex: The Annabel Chong Story, a 1999 documentary film
"Sex" (Kath & Kim episode)
Sex (TV series), an Australian television series

Literature
Sex (book), a 1992 book by Madonna and Steven Meisel
Sex (play), a 1926 play by Mae West

Music
SEX, pseudonym of American rapper Young Thug

Albums
Sex (Elli Kokkinou album), 2005
Sex (The Necks album), 1989
Sex (The 1975 EP), 2012
Sex (Tila Tequila EP), 2007
Sex, by Telex, 1981
Sex (Vintage album), 2009

Songs
"Sex" (The 1975 song), 2012
"Sex" (Cheat Codes and Kris Kross Amsterdam song), 2016
"S.E.X." (Lyfe Jennings song), 2006
"Sex" (Lenny Kravitz song), 2014
"Sex" (Mötley Crüe song), 2012
"Sex" (Oomph! song), 1994
"Sex (I'm A...)", by Berlin, 1983
"Sex", by Eden from I Think You Think Too Much of Me, 2016
"SEX", by Frank Zappa from The Man from Utopia, 1983
"S.E.X.", by Nickelback from Dark Horse, 2008
"Sex", by Rammstein from Untitled Rammstein album, 2019
"Sexual" (song), by Neiked, featuring Dyo, 2016
"Sexual", by Die Toten Hosen from Love, Peace & Money, 1994
"Sexual (Li Da Di)", by Amber from Amber, 1999

Other uses
Sextans or Sex, a constellation
Sex (boutique), in London
SEX (computing), an assembly language mnemonic
Sodium ethyl xanthate, or SEX, a chemical compound used in the mining industry
Sex-, the Latin prefix meaning 6
Sex Peak, a mountain in Montana, United States

See also

S3X (disambiguation)